Hazariganj Union is a union of Char Fasson Upazila under Bhola District.

Area
The area of Hazariganj Union is 6,326 acres.

Administration
Hazariganj Union is union parishad No. 10 under Char Fasson Upazila. Administrative activities of the union are under the jurisdiction of Shashibhushan police station. It is part of Bhola-4 constituency 118 of the National Assembly.

Demographics
According to the 2011 census, the total population of Hazariganj Union is 30,396. Of these, 15,413 are males and 14,963 are females. Total families are 6,008.

Education
According to the 2011 census, the literacy rate of Hazariganj Union is 42.1%.

Hazari Gonj Hamidia Fazil Madrasah is one of the educational institutions located in Hazariganj Union.

References

See also
Unions of Bangladesh
Unions of Bhola District
Char Fasson Upazila
Bhola District
Unions of Char Fasson Upazila